The 1993 Kentucky Wildcats football team represented the University of Kentucky in the 1993 NCAA Division I-A football season. The Wildcats scored 207 points while allowing 195 points.  Kentucky played in the 1993 Peach Bowl.

Season
Kentucky opened with a 35–0 win over Kent State.  Kentucky then lost to #7 Florida on a touchdown play at the end of the game, 24–20.  A 24–8 loss at Indiana followed.  Kentucky then won a nationally televised ESPN Thursday night matchup at South Carolina, 21–17, followed by a 21–0 shutout of #25 Ole Miss.

A 35–17 victory over LSU followed.  Kentucky then lost 33–28 at Georgia in a nationally televised game.  Kentucky then won 26–17 at Mississippi State, lost 12–7 at Vanderbilt, and clinched bowl eligibility with a 6–3 win against East Carolina.  A 48–0 loss to Tennessee closed the regular season.

Kentucky closed the season in the 1993 Peach Bowl against #24 Clemson.  Kentucky led for most of the game but lost on a late touchdown, 14–13.

Schedule

Personnel

Season summary

Florida

Team players in the 1994 NFL Draft

References

Kentucky
Kentucky Wildcats football seasons
Kentucky Wildcats football